Chabua Assembly constituency is one of the 126 assembly constituencies of Assam Legislative Assembly. Chabua forms part of the Lakhimpur Lok Sabha constituency.

Town Details

Following are details on Chabua Assembly constituency-

Country: India.
 State: Assam.
 District: Dibrugarh district .
 Lok Sabha Constituency: Lakhimpur Lok Sabha/Parliamentary constituency..
 Assembly Categorisation: Rural constituency.
 Literacy Level:  76.22%.
 Eligible Electors as per 2021 General Elections: 1,65,742 Eligible Electors. Male Electors: 82,136  . Female Electors: 83,604.
 Geographic Co-Ordinates:  27°37'06.2"N 95°21'31.0"E.
 Total Area Covered: 212 square kilometres.
 Area Includes: Chabua thana and Ghorbondi (part) mouza in Tinsukia thana (part) in Dibrugarh sub-division; and Rangagora, Ghorbondi (part) and Bogdung (part) mouzas in Tinsukia thana (part) in Tinsukia sub- division of Assam.
 Inter State Border :Dibrugarh.
 Number Of Polling Stations: Year 2011-188,Year 2016-189,Year 2021-121.

Members of Legislative Assembly

Following is the list of past members representing Chabua Assembly constituency in Assam Legislature.

 1978: Jnan Gogoi, Janata Party.
 1983: Upendra Sanatan, Indian National Congress.
 1985: Bhuban Barua, Independent.
 1991: Upendra Sanatan, Indian National Congress.
 1996: Bhaben Baruah, Asom Gana Parishad.
 2001: Raju Sahu, Indian National Congress.
 2006: Raju Sahu, Indian National Congress.
 2011: Raju Sahu, Indian National Congress.
 2016: Binod Hazarika, Bharatiya Janata Party.
 2021: Ponakan Baruah, Asom Gana Parishad.

Election results

2016 result

References

External links 
 

Assembly constituencies of Assam